Karen Asatryan (born 21 December 1974) is an Armenian football player. He has played for Armenia national team.

National team statistics

References

1974 births
Living people
Armenian footballers

Association football midfielders
Armenia international footballers